The Commandant General in Stockholm is a military position in Sweden with responsibility for state ceremonial activities. Lieutenant General Michael Claesson, Chief of Joint Operations is the Commandant General in Stockholm since 2020.

History
The King's Adjutant General was tasked with, among other things, commanding the troops in Stockholm. In 1810 a commanding Adjutant General of Stockholm Garrison was appointed. In 1818, this position was referred to as the Commandant General of Stockholm Garrison. Prior to November 1905, the Commandant General was a specially appointed general officer, after which the position was taken over by the commanding officer of the IV Army Division (1905–1927), Eastern Army Division (1928–1936), IV Army Division (1937–1942), then by the military commander of the Eastern Military District (Milo Ö) (1942–1991), then by the commanding officer of the Middle Military District (Milo M) (1991–2000), and finally by the commanding officer of the Central Military District (MD M) (2000–2005). After 2005, when the military districts were discontinued, a three-star general or flag officer of the Swedish Armed Forces has held the position as the Commandant General. The position was held by the Chief of Joint Operations (2005–2012) and by the Chief of Defence Staff (2012–2018). Since 30 November 2018, the Supreme Commander has appointed the Commandant General in Stockholm.

Tasks

2005–2018
According to the Swedish Armed Forces Code of Statutes 2005:6, the Commandant General in Stockholm is the chief representative of the state ceremonial activities of the Swedish Armed Forces. The Commandant General shall advise the Supreme Commander in matters relating to state ceremonial activities. The Commandant General is appointed by Supreme Commander and must be a minimum of major general. The Commandant General in Stockholm and the Commandant of Stockholm are:

 The Commandant General or the Commandant of Stockholm shall, if necessary, participate in state ceremonies or at other ceremonies organized in conjunction with national ceremonies or foreign official visits in Sweden or on similar occasions. They will also participate in receptions or visits if the King, the Regent ad interim, the Speaker of the Riksdag, the Prime Minister, the Marshal of the Realm, a cabinet minister or the Swedish Armed Forces Headquarters request it.
 It is the responsibility of the Commandant General or when he is prevented from attending, the Commandant of Stockholm, to receive such heads of foreign states' military units on an official visit in Stockholm, in the Royal Guards Wing of the Stockholm Palace.

2018–present
According to the Swedish Armed Forces Code of Statutes 2018:3, the Commandant General shall:

brief the Supreme Commander on matters relating to state ceremonial activities
coordinate the Swedish Armed Forces' participation in state ceremonial activities
at the request of the Speaker of the Riksdag, the Prime Minister, the Marshal of the Realm, a cabinet minister or the Swedish Armed Forces Headquarters, give the Commandant Staff (Kommendantstaben) the task of planning and implementing the participation of the Royal Guards, honorary forces, parading troops and military music
cooperate with the Speaker of the Riksdag, the Prime Minister, the Marshal of the Realm and the Chief of His Majesty's Military Staff in matters concerning state ceremonies
collaborate with other authorities and organizations in joint ceremonies
establish rules of procedure for the Commandant Staff
if necessary, attend state ceremonies and ceremonies organized in connection with domestic ceremonies or foreign official visits or on similar occasions
participate in receptions or visits if the head of state, Deputy Regent (Riksföreståndare), the Speaker of the Riksdag, the Prime Minister, the Marshal of the Realm, a cabinet minister or the Swedish Armed Forces Headquarters so request
in the Royal Guards Wing at Stockholm Palace receive heads of foreign states' military units who are on an official visit to Stockholm.

The Commandant General in Stockholm may delegate the tasks to the Commandant of Stockholm.

Uniform
The Commandant General is wearing a staff (m/1793) that is steel blue and sprinkled with gold crowns and fitted with a gold knob and chape. The staff is provided with a twist in gold and black silk with a hard braided tuft. At the deposing of King Gustav IV Adolf in March 1809, the staff played an important symbolic role as the one who held the staff is also associated with the person who was in charge in Stockholm.

Heraldry
The coat of arms of the Commandant General in Stockholm. Blazon: "Azure, powdered with open crowns and charged with the badge of Stockholm, the crowned head of Saint Eric couped, all or. The shield surmounted a sword bendwise and a baton bendwise sinister in saltire, both or, the baton charged with open crowns azure placed two and one".

List of officeholders

Footnotes

References

Military appointments of Sweden
Stockholm Garrison